Polyptychus herbuloti is a moth of the  family Sphingidae. It is known from Cameroon, the Central African Republic, the Democratic Republic of the Congo and Gabon.

The length of the forewings is 43–45 mm.

References

Polyptychus
Moths described in 1990
Fauna of the Central African Republic
Fauna of Gabon
Moths of Africa